Ahed Tamimi (also romanized Ahd; born 31 January 2001) is a Palestinian activist from the village of Nabi Salih in the occupied West Bank in Palestine. She is best known for appearances in images and videos in which she confronts Israeli soldiers. Tamimi's advocates consider her a freedom fighter for Palestine, comparing her to Malala Yousafzai; her detractors argue she is manipulated by political parents and has been taught to engage with violence.

In December 2017, she was detained by Israeli authorities for slapping a soldier. The incident was filmed and went viral, attracting international interest and debate. Tamimi was sentenced to eight months in prison after agreeing to a plea bargain and released on 29 July 2018.

Early life
Her father, Bassem Tamimi, was born in 1967, the year the occupation began. In January 2018, Harriet Sherwood wrote that he and his children "have known only a life of checkpoints, identity papers, detentions, house demolitions, intimidation, humiliation and violence. This is their normality."

According to her father, Tamimi is subjected to threats from Israeli forces when she is recognised. To protect her from harassment, her parents relocated her to a relative's home in Ramallah so she did not have to pass through Israeli checkpoints to continue her secondary education. By Bassem's estimate, the family home, which had been slated for demolition in 2010 just prior to the village's adoption of its weekly protests, has been subjected to 150 military raids as of September 2017.

Activism
Tamimi has been involved in protests and political agitation expressing her opposition to the expansion of Israeli settlements and detention of Palestinians. She has argued that documented, organized protests against the Israeli occupation will lead to wider recognition of the Palestinian struggle for autonomy; her viral images and videos have produced a wave of public reactions in Israel and Palestine, as well as internationally.

At 11 years old, Tamimi was commended by Palestinian president Mahmoud Abbas for attempting to intervene during her mother's arrest in August 2012. When an Israeli soldier arrested her older brother in 2012, Tamini was mentioned in the international media. The image of Tamimi waving a fist while confronting him went viral on social media and she was invited to travel to Turkey by the Turkish Prime Minister, Recep Tayyip Erdoğan. Three years later she gained attention after she was seen biting and hitting a masked Israeli soldier who was in the process of taking her younger brother away because he was throwing stones. In December 2016, the United States denied Tamimi a visa for a speaking tour titled "No Child Behind Bars/Living Resistance".

Slapping incident

On 15 December 2017, Tamimi took part in a demonstration in Nabi Salih opposing the expansion of Israeli settlements near her village. The protest turned violent when around 200 of the demonstrators threw stones at Israeli soldiers; the soldiers organized to quell the unrest and entered the Tamimi house to subdue protesters who, according to the army, continued to throw stones from inside the house. According to the Tamimi family, during the protest Ahed's 15-year-old cousin Mohammed Tamimi was shot in the head at close range with a rubber-coated steel bullet, severely wounding him. In response, Tamimi, along with her mother and cousin Nour, approached the two soldiers outside the Tamimi home, and were filmed slapping, kicking, and shoving them; the soldiers did not retaliate.

Her cousin was put in a medically induced coma to treat his head injury and regained consciousness a few days later. Footage of the incident was uploaded to Nariman Tamimi's Facebook page and went viral. Days later, on 19 December Tamimi was arrested in a nighttime raid. Despite concerns about the use of military court for a minor who may have been singled out for "embarrassing the occupation", thirteen days later Tamimi was charged with assault, incitement, and throwing stones; her mother and Nour joined her, having been arrested in relation to the incident. Her mother was also charged with incitement and assault after posting a video in which the indictment claims Tamimi urged violent attacks against Israel. The case drew global attention and spurred debate over the soldiers' restraint in Palestinian and Israeli societies. Rallies in support of Tamimi took place in North America and Europe.

On 24 March 2018, Tamimi agreed to a plea bargain with prosecutors whereby she would serve eight months in prison and pay a 5,000-shekel ($1,437) fine. As part of the agreement, she pleaded guilty to one count of assault, one count of incitement, and two counts—‌unrelated to the December 2017 incident—‌of obstructing soldiers. While in prison, Tamimi earned her high school degree; she was released on 29 July, resolving to study law and "hold the occupation accountable". A mural of Tamimi on the Separation Wall was completed by two Italian artists—including Jorit Agoch—as an act of homage to coincide with her release. Both artists were arrested and forced to leave Israel.

Analysis
Tamimi has been described as one of the new symbols of Palestinian resistance to Israeli military occupation in the West Bank. Many Palestinians have protested their living conditions, but Tamimi is one of the few internationally recognized figures of the cause. She is credited with energizing Palestinians demoralized by years of Israeli settlement building and bringing renewed attention to Israel's occupation of the West Bank; her case also highlighted Israel's detention and prosecution of Palestinian minors. Ben Ehrenreich, a journalist who documented the Tamimi family in 2012, saw her physical appearance as a factor in her celebrity; "A great deal of work goes into ‘othering’ Palestinians," he wrote, "to casting them as some really recognizable other." Ehrenreich continued: "when suddenly the kid [Tamimi] doesn't fit into those stereotypes—when she actually looks like a European kid or an American kid—then suddenly all that work of dehumanization can't function." Since 2010, the Israeli military detained and prosecuted 8,000 Palestinian children.

Tamimi's detractors consider her actions staged performances aimed at discrediting Israel. She and her family have been denounced in Israel as "terrorist sympathizers". Others, including Israeli parliamentarian Michael Oren, accuse her of dressing up in "American clothes" to provoke responses from soldiers. Some Palestinians also suggest that the video may have hurt their cause by showing the soldiers behaving passively.

Documentary 

Jesse Roberts of Rise Up International and Jesse Locke of AMZ Productions filmed a documentary, Radiance of Resistance, that featured the then 14-year-old Tamimi and 9-year-old Janna Jihad. In 2017 it was screened worldwide at a number of festivals, including the Respect Human Rights Film Festival in Belfast, Northern Ireland, where it won Best Documentary. The Singapore Government's Media Development Authority (IMDA) banned public screenings of Radiance of Resistance for its "skewed narrative" which could cause "disharmony" in the country. The government's ban was described as censorship.

References

External links

2001 births
Child activists
Living people
Palestinian activists
Palestinian human rights activists
Palestinian children
Palestinian people imprisoned by Israel
People convicted of assault
People from Nabi Salih